Sandra Levenez (born 5 July 1979, in Carhaix-Plouguer) is a French triathlete, duathlete, and cyclist, who currently rides for UCI Women's Continental Team . She was selected to compete in the road race at the 2020 UCI Road World Championships. She is also a two time duathlon world champion as well as a four time European champion.

Major results
2020
 2nd La Périgord Ladies
 4th Time trial, National Road Championships
 5th Overall Tour Cycliste Féminin International de l'Ardèche

References

External links

1979 births
Living people
French female cyclists
French female triathletes
Duathletes
Sportspeople from Finistère
Cyclists from Brittany